Foundation Imaging, Inc. was a CGI visual effects studio, computer animation studio, and post-production editing facility.

History
The company was founded by Paul Beigle-Bryant and Ron Thornton. It pioneered digital imaging for television programming using Newtek's LightWave 3D, originally on Commodore Amiga based Video Toaster workstations.

Dissolution
The company was dissolved after work on season one of Star Trek: Enterprise had been completed and the company assets were sold off in a public auction on December 17, 2002 by Brian Testo Associates, LLC.

Legacy
The company's pioneering work on Babylon 5 popularized using the software package Lightwave 3D on US TV shows for CGI visual effects, which led to it becoming an industry standard throughout the 1990s.

Key animators from the company and Emmy Award-winners Adam "Mojo" Lebowitz and John Teska remain major figures in the visual effects field for their work on shows such as the rebooted Battlestar Galactica and Lost.

Notable works

Babylon 5
Foundation Imaging is best known for their work on the science fiction series Babylon 5, winning an Emmy Award for the pilot episode.

Star Trek franchise
After completing the third season of Babylon 5, they worked on Paramount's Star Trek: Voyager and Star Trek: Deep Space Nine (ultimately winning two more Emmy Awards for their work on Voyager).

Foundation Imaging made the exterior views rendered by computer graphics for the Delta Flyer shuttlecraft, from drawings by Rick Sternbach, debuting on Voyager in the "Extreme Risk". They also did the CGI views of the Varro generation ship in the episode "The Disease" for example.

The company also worked on Robert Wise's director's cut of Star Trek: The Motion Picture. This was one of Foundation Imaging's last projects before they shut down. Lebowitz also worked with Paramount Plus on the film's 2022 restoration.

Batman CG visuals
While working on Star Trek, the company provided CG visuals for the Warner Brothers direct-to-video animated movies based on the Batman: The Animated Series TV series.

Project history

Movies
The Jackal (1997)
Batman & Mr. Freeze: SubZero (1998)
Today's Life (2000)
The Legend of Zu (2001) (Blood Sea sequence)
They Crawl (2001)
Project Viper (2002)
The Extreme Team (2003)
Chrome (2005)

Live action series
Babylon 5 (1993 - 1996) (seasons 1-3)
Hypernauts (1995 - 1996) (season 1)
Star Trek: Voyager (1996 - 2001) (seasons 3-7)
Star Trek: Deep Space Nine (1997 - 1999) (the season 5 finale, seasons 6-7)
Young Hercules (1998 - 1999)
Dawson's Creek (2000) (single episode water effects)
Star Trek: Enterprise (2001 - 2002) (season 1)

Animated series
Roughnecks: Starship Troopers Chronicles (1999)
Max Steel (2001)
Dan Dare (2002)

Video games
Twisted Metal: Black (2001) (CG movie and visual effects)

DVD
Star Trek: The Motion Picture (DVD director's edition)

Awards
1993 Emmy Award – Babylon 5 – Outstanding Individual Achievement In Special Visual Effects:
Paul Beigle-Bryant, Computer Imaging Supervisor - Foundation Imaging
Shannon Casey, Visual Effects Coordinator
Ron Thornton, Visual Effects Designer - Foundation Imaging
1999 Emmy Award – Star Trek: Voyager – Outstanding Special Visual Effects For A Series:
Rob Bonchune, CGI Supervisor - Foundation Imaging
Elizabeth Castro, Visual Effects Coordinator
Arthur J. Codron, Visual Effects Coordinator
Dan Curry, Visual Effects Producer/Supervisor
Don Greenberg, Visual Effects Compositor
Paul Hill, Visual Effects Compositor
Adam "Mojo" Lebowitz, CGI Supervisor - Foundation Imaging
Ronald B. Moore, Visual Effects Supervisor
Greg Rainoff, Visual Effects Artist
Mitch Suskin, Visual Effects Supervisor
John Teska, CGI Animator - Foundation Imaging
2001 Emmy Award – Star Trek: Voyager – Outstanding Special Visual Effects For A Series:
Robert Bonchune, CGI Supervisor - Foundation Imaging
Eric Chauvin, Matte Artist
Art Codron, Visual Effects Coordinator
Dan Curry, Visual Effects Producer
Steve Fong, Visual Effects Compositor
Ronald Moore, Visual Effects Supervisor
Greg Rainoff, Visual Effects Animator
Mitch Suskin, Visual Effects Supervisor
John Teska, CGI Artist - Foundation Imaging

References

External links
Babylon 5 - Online!: Interview with Ron Thornton
Trek Today: Interview with Paul Bryant
Newtek.com: Interview with Kyle Toucher
Newtek.com: Interview with Kevin "Q" Quattro

Visual effects companies
American animation studios
Defunct film and television production companies of the United States